Nakhimovsky Prospekt is a station of Serpukhovsko-Timiryazevskaya Line of Moscow metro between Nagornaya and Sevastopolskaya. It was designed by V. S. Volovich, L. N. Popov, V. I. Klokov, and G. S. Mun.

Moscow Metro stations
Serpukhovsko-Timiryazevskaya Line
Railway stations in Russia opened in 1983
Railway stations located underground in Russia